C. cookei may refer to:

 Cibicidoides cookei, a foraminiferan in the family Anomalinidae 
 Collybia cookei, a species of fungus in the family Tricholomataceae, known from Europe, Asia, and North America
 Conus cookei, an extinct species of cone snail
 Crystallodytes cookei, the South Pacific sandburrower, a fish in the family Creediidae